Molotov Remembers: Inside Kremlin Politics is a 1993 book (ISBN 1-56663-715-5) written by Russian biographer Felix Chuev and edited by American academic Albert Resis. The 1991 Russian language version of the book was published as Sto Sorok Besed s Molotovym with an afterword by Soviet Historian Sergei Kuleshov. Kirkus Reviews described Molotov Remembers as "the most extensive overview ever available by a Bolshevik founding father of the Soviet Union's youth and middle age." It is a frequently cited primary source for the period and one of the most useful memoirs of the immediate post-dissolution of the Soviet Union, from a research standpoint. 

Molotov Remembers primarily consists of Soviet politician and diplomat Viacheslav Mikhailovich Molotov's interviews with Chuev. Chuev met with Molotov regularly from 1969 to 1986 (the last 17 years of the politician's life) and engaged in a series of interviews "each on the average four to five hours." From 1970 to 1977, historian Shota Kvantaliani also participated in the interviews.From these discussions, Chuev kept a diary (which reached 5,000 typewritten pages) in which he recorded "in detail every talk, every statement, and questioning and clarifying them in later meetings." Approximately 700 pages of Chuev's "Molotov Diary" were ultimately included in Molotov Remembers. The fact that Molotov did not leave memoirs highlights the significance of the book. As Chuev records, Molotov stated that he was "not interested in who said what and where, who spat on what...Lenin didn't write memoirs, nor did Stalin [...] I write about socialism -- what it is and, as peasants say, 'what we need it for.'"

The dialogues in Molotov Remembers are broad in scope, covering topics that range from international affairs (with a focus on the World War II and post-War World War II period), personal remembrances of Lenin and Stalin, intra-party politics, Molotov's own expulsion from the party (he was reinstated in 1984), Marxist political theory, and the difficulties of the Soviet purges and the famine that accompanied collectivization. In summary, Molotov demonstrates his pride in the successes of the Soviet Union, while attempting to place its wrong or errors in the context of the difficulties it faced. For example, in the context of the purges during the 1930s and his own hand in them, Molotov argues that World War II might have otherwise been lost:

"Socialism demands immense effort. And that includes sacrifices. Mistakes were made in the process. But we could have suffered greater losses in the war -- perhaps even defeat -- if the leadership had flinched and had allowed internal disagreements, like cracks in a rock. Had leadership broken down in the 1930s we would have been in a most critical situation, many times more critical than actually turned out. I bear responsibility for this policy of repression and consider it correct. Admittedly, I have always said grave mistakes and excesses were committed, but the policy on the whole was correct."

The book is also notable for the multiple perspectives its offers on its subject. In addition to the extensive reproduction of Molotov's perspective in his own words, Chuev's authorial voice appears in many dialogues and the prefatory matter—it is generally sympathetic to Molotov. Another perspective is supplied by Resis, the editor of the English language edition, who is hostile to his subject (i.e., "In Molotov, never has a prime minister or foreign minister of a great country more zealously, proudly, and effectively served a more monstrous master and his legacy)."

References 

Russian-language books
1991 books
History books about the Soviet Union